Balreagh is a townland in County Westmeath, Ireland.

Balreagh is one of 34 townlands of the civil parish of Rathconnell in the barony of Moyashel and Magheradernon in the Province of Leinster.

The neighbouring townlands are: Clondalever (Taghmon), Clondalever (Kilpatrick) and Gigginstown to the north, Jeffrystown, Edmondstown and Killynan (Pratt) to the east, Killynan (Cooke) and Clonkill to the south, Downs and
Rathcorbally to the west and Taghmon to the north–west.

In the 1911 census of Ireland there were 14 houses and 51 inhabitants in the townland.

References

External links
Map of Balreagh at openstreetmap.org
Balreagh at the IreAtlas Townland Data Base
Balreagh at Townlands.ie
Balreagh at The Placenames Database of Ireland

Townlands of County Westmeath